Year 1300 (MCCC) was a leap year starting on Friday (link will display the full calendar) of the Julian calendar, the 1300th year of the Common Era (CE) and Anno Domini (AD) designations, the 300th year of the 2nd millennium, the 100th and last year of the 13th century, and the 1st year of the 1300s decade. The year 1300 was not a leap year in the Proleptic Gregorian calendar.

Events 
 By place 

 Europe 
 Spring – Bohemian forces under Wenceslaus II of the Czech House of Přemyslid, seize Pomerania and Greater Poland (Wielkopolska). The 28-year-old Wenceslaus already rules Lesser Poland (Małopolska) since 1291, and forced a number of Silesian princes to swear allegiance to him. He is crowned as king and reunites the Polish territories. During his reign, Wenceslaus also introduces a number of laws and reforms, the most important being the creation of a new type of official known as a starosta (or Elder), who rules a small territory as the king's direct representative.Williams, Hywel (2005). Cassell's Chronology of World History, p. 152. London: Weidenfeld & Nicolson. .
 Franco–Flemish War: King Philip IV (the Fair) begins to invade Flanders again after the expiration of an armistice in January. French forces plunder and devastate the countryside around Ypres. The king's brother, Charles of Valois, marches from Bruges to the outskirts of Ghent. He burns Nevele and twelve other towns. In March, French forces besiege Damme and Ypres. At the end of April, Damme, Aardenburg and Sluis surrender. By mid-May, the whole of Flanders is under French control, and several Flemish nobles (like Guy of Namur) are taken into captivity in France.

 England 
 July – King Edward I (Longshanks) starts another Scottish campaign and marches north with his army, accompanied by several knights of Brittany and Lorraine. After a short siege lasting only 5 days, Caerlaverock Castle is captured. The 16-year-old Prince Edward of Caernarfon is appointed to take command of the rearguard of the English army but part from a small skirmish, he sees no action.
 Summer – Edward I (Longshanks) invades Galloway and confronts a Scottish army under John Comyn III (the Red) on the River Cree. During the battle, the Scottish cavalry is again defeated. Edward is unable to pursue the fugitives into the wild country, where they flee and take refuge. John escapes with his life and begins to raid the English countryside in smaller groups.
 August – Pope Boniface VIII sends a letter to Edward I (Longshanks) demanding that he should withdraw from Scotland. Edward ignores the letter, but because the campaign is not a success, the English forces begin on their home journey. Edward arranges a truce with the Scots on October 30 and returns home.

 Oasisamerica 
 The Ancestral Puebloans abandon the Mesa Verde region in the Colorado Plateau.

 By topic 

 Cities and Towns 
 June 15 – Diego López V de Haro, Spanish nobleman and Lord of Biscay, founds the city of Bilbao through a municipal charter in Valladolid.
 
 Religion 
 February 22 – The Jubilee of Boniface VIII is celebrated. It is at this celebration that Giovanni Villani decides to write his universal history of Florence, called the Nuova Cronica ("New Chronicles").
 June 17 – Turku Cathedral is consecrated by Bishop Magnus I at Turku. During his reign, he helps to complete the Christianization in Finland.
 July 18 – Gerard Segarelli, Italian founder of the Apostolic Brethren, is burn at the stake in Parma during a brutal repression of the Apostolics.

Births 
 January 21 – Roger Clifford, English nobleman and knight (d. 1322)
 January 28 – Chūgan Engetsu, Japanese poet and writer (d. 1375)
 February 1 – Bolko II of Ziębice, Polish nobleman and knight (d. 1341)
 April 4 – Constance of Aragon, Aragonese princess (infanta) (d. 1327)
 June 1 – Thomas of Brotherton, English nobleman and prince (d. 1338)
 September 27 – Adolf of the Rhine, German nobleman (d. 1327)
 October 9 – John de Grey, English nobleman and knight (d. 1359)
 December 22 – Khutughtu Khan Kusala, Mongol emperor (d. 1329)
 Charles d'Artois, Neapolitan nobleman, knight and chancellor (d. 1346)
 Dionigi di Borgo San Sepolcro, Italian bishop and theologian (d. 1342)
 Gerard III, Dutch nobleman, knight, bailiff and rebel leader (d. 1358)
 Guillaume de Harsigny, French doctor and court physician (d. 1393)
 Guillaume de Machaut, French priest, poet and composer (d. 1377)
 Immanuel Bonfils, French mathematician and astronomer (d. 1377)
 Jakov of Serres, Serbian scholar, hierarch and translator (d. 1365)
 Jeanne de Clisson, French noblewoman and privateer (d. 1359)
 Joanna of Pfirt, German noblewoman (House of Habsburg) (d. 1351)
 Johannes Tauler, German preacher, mystic and theologian (d. 1361)
 John III, Dutch nobleman and knight (House of Reginar) (d. 1355)
 John Sheppey, English administrator, treasurer and bishop (d. 1360)
 Jordan of Quedlinburg, German preacher, hermit and writer (d. 1380)
 Richard FitzRalph, Norman-Irish archbishop and theologian (d. 1360)
 Simon Locard (or Lockhart), Scottish landowner and knight (d. 1371)
 Thomas Bradwardine, English archbishop and theologian (d. 1349)

Deaths 
 January 14 – Isabella of Lusignan, French noblewoman (b. 1224)
 February 19 – Munio of Zamora, Spanish friar and bishop (b. 1237)
 July 18 – Gerard Segarelli, Italian founder of the Apostolic Brethren
 September 24 – Edmund of Cornwall, English nobleman (b. 1249)
 September 29 – Juliana FitzGerald, Norman noblewoman (b. 1263)
 December 12 – Bartolo da San Gimignano, Italian priest (b. 1228)
 Albert III, German nobleman, knight and co-ruler (House of Ascania) 
 Albertus de Chiavari, Italian priest, Master General and philosopher
 Berengaria of Castile, Spanish noblewoman and princess (b. 1253)
 Demetrios Pepagomenos, Byzantine physician, scientist and writer
 Geoffrey de Mowbray, Scottish nobleman, knight and Chief Justiciar
 Guido Cavalcanti, Italian poet and friend of Dante Alighieri (b. 1250)
 Güneri of Karaman, Turkish nobleman (bey) (House of Karamanid)
 Herman VIII, German nobleman and co-ruler (House of Zähringen) 
 Jeanne de Montfort de Chambéon, Swiss noblewoman and regent
 Kangan Giin, Japanese Buddhist scholar and Zen Master (b. 1217)
 Thomas de Somerville, Scottish nobleman and rebel leader (b. 1245)
 Tran Hung Dao, Vietnamese Grand Prince and statesman (b. 1228)
 William of Nangis, French monk, chronicler and historian (b. 1250)

References

Further reading
 Alexandra Gajewski & Zoë Opacic (ed.), The Year 1300 and the Creation of a New European Architecture (Architectura Medii Aevi, 1), Turnhout, Belgium: Brepols, 2007.